The 2019–20 UAB Blazers basketball team represented the University of Alabama at Birmingham during the 2019–20 NCAA Division I men's basketball season. The Blazers, led by fourth-year head coach Robert Ehsan, play their home games at the Bartow Arena as members of Conference USA.

Offseason

Departures

Incoming transfers

Roster

Schedule and results
 
|-
!colspan=9 style=|Exhibition

|-
!colspan=9 style=| Non-conference regular season

|-
!colspan=9 style=| Conference USA regular season

|-
!colspan=9 style=| Conference USA tournament

|-

Source

References

UAB Blazers men's basketball seasons
UAB
UAB
UAB